The  Baltimore Colts season was the seventh season for the team in the National Football League. The defending champion Baltimore Colts finished the NFL's 40th season with a record of 9 wins and 3 losses and finished first in the Western Conference, and defeated the New York Giants, 31–16 in the NFL championship game, which was the rematch of the previous season's classic title game, for their second consecutive NFL title.

Colts quarterback Johnny Unitas had one of the great seasons by a passer in NFL history. Says Cold Hard Football Facts, "[Unitas's] 32 scoring strikes was an NFL record –- he was the first and only to top 30 [touchdowns] in the NFL's first 40 years –- and remains the standard for a 12-game season. He was in the midst of his record 47-game streak with a touchdown pass, and connected on at least one in every game of 1959."

Cold Hard Football Facts also notes that the 1959 Colts were the only team in NFL history to lead the league in both offensive and defensive (i.e. opponents') passer rating for two consecutive seasons (1958–1959). Every other team to had ever led the league in both has won an NFL championship.

The Colts defeated the Green Bay Packers twice this season in Vince Lombardi's first year as head coach. Baltimore did not win the Western title again until 1964 and their next NFL title came in 1968.

Regular season

Schedule

Standings

Postseason 

The 1959 NFL championship game was played on December 27 at Memorial Stadium in Baltimore, Maryland. The game was a rematch of the previous year's title game that went into overtime. The 1959 game was the 27th annual NFL championship game. The Colts beat the Giants 31–16, earning their second consecutive NFL championship over the Giants.

Awards and honors 
 Johnny Unitas, Bert Bell Award

See also 
 History of the Indianapolis Colts
 Indianapolis Colts seasons
 Colts–Patriots rivalry

References 

Baltimore Colts
1959
National Football League championship seasons
Baltimore Colt